The Crooked Forest is a grove of oddly-shaped pine trees located in the village of Nowe Czarnowo near the town of Gryfino, West Pomerania, in north-western Poland. It is a protected natural monument of Poland.

This grove of 400 pines was planted in around 1930. Each pine tree bends sharply to the north, just above ground level, then curves back upright after a sideways excursion of three to nine feet (1–3 m). The curved pines are enclosed by a surrounding forest of straight pine trees.

It is generally believed that some form of human tool or technique was used to make the trees grow or bend this way, but the method has never been determined, and remains a mystery to this day. It has been speculated that the trees may have been deformed to create naturally curved timber for use in furniture or boat building. Others surmise that a snowstorm could have bent the trunks, but there is little evidence of that.

The forest was featured in season 1, episode 4 of The UnXplained on the History channel titled "Unnatural Nature" that first aired on 9 August 2019.

The site is open to the public and serves as a notable tourist attraction in the region.

See also 
 Dancing Forest
 Drunken trees
 Tree shaping
 Wood warping

References

External links

Polish tourism page for the Crooked Forest 

Forests of Poland
Gryfino County
Natural monuments of Poland